Blastobasis ianella is a moth in the family Blastobasidae. It is found in Thailand.

The length of the forewings is 6.3–7 mm. The basal third of the forewings is pale brown intermixed with a few brownish-grey scales tipped with pale brown. The distal  has brownish-grey scales tipped with pale brown, intermixed with a few pale brown scales. The hindwings are pale greyish brown.

Etymology
The species is named in honour of the then newly born Ian Edward Emanuel.

References

Moths described in 2003
Blastobasis